The Ashuapmushuan River is a river in the Saguenay–Lac-Saint-Jean region of the Canadian provinces of Quebec. It starts at the outlet of Lake Ashuapmushuan, and flows first in a north-easterly direction for about  whereafter it continues south-east to Saint-Félicien. There it drains into Lac Saint-Jean of which it is the third largest tributary after the Peribonka and Mistassini Rivers.

The Ashuapmushuan River forms the northern boundary of the Ashuapmushuan Wildlife Reserve for most of its length. As a wild undeveloped river, and accessible from Quebec Route 167 close to Lake Ashuapmushuan, it is a popular destination for canoe camping.

A new  aquatic reserve is being considered that would protect  of the Ashuapmushuan River, including its floodplain and valley slopes. The reserve prohibits logging, mining, and hydro-electric development, while protecting critical landlocked salmon habitats, biodiversity, and sites of archaeological interest.

Etymology
The name Ashuapmushuan, which was not officially adopted until 1982, is an Innu word meaning "place where one lies in wait for moose".

The river was however first called Necouba by Louis Jolliet in 1679. This name was also used by Jean-Baptiste-Louis Franquelin and Guillaume Delisle in 1686 and 1703 respectively. But in 1732 surveyor Normandin considered this an error, who referred to the Necoubeau as a tributary to Lake Ashuapmushuan that was called Lake Chomonchouane by Laure on his maps of 1731 and 1732. Therefore, Normandin renamed the river to Chomontchouane. In 1917, the Commission de géographie officially adopted the modernized spelling of Chamouchouane.

Geography

The Ashuapmushuan basin is part of the Central Laurentians in the natural region of the Lake Manouane Depression. The river is enclosed in narrow valleys for a large part of its course, with powerful rapids and a dozen waterfalls, of which the most impressive are the Chaudière Falls.

  north-east to a bend in the river; then east, to the Mazarin River (coming from the north);
  south-east, up to the confluence of the Du Chef River (coming from the north);

  southeasterly, up to a bend in the river, corresponding to the outlet (coming from the north) of Desautels stream;
  southeasterly in a straight line, up to a bend corresponding to the outlet (coming from the south) of several lakes including Lac en Dentelle and Lac Charles-Lacroix ;
  towards the east by forming three large curves towards the north, until the confluence of the rivière aux Brochets (coming from east);
  eastwards, to the confluence of the Kanishushteu River (coming from the west);
  towards the east, then turning towards the south-east in a deep valley, until the confluence of the Chigoubiche River (coming from the west);

  eastwards, up to a bend corresponding to the outlet of lakes André, Larouaque and Guillemet;
  first towards the south by crossing a series of rapids, then the Chutes de la Chaudière; then turning southeast in a deep valley, to a bend in the river, then east (slightly to the south) almost in a straight line, collecting the outlet (coming from the south) from Lac de la Savane, to the confluence of the Moncou stream (coming from the north);
  crossing the White Spruce Rapids, collecting the Petite rivière aux Saumons (coming from the north-west), collecting the outlet of Lac du Cran, until at the Cran river (coming from the south);
  first towards the east by forming a hook towards the north, in particular by collecting the Rivière à la Loutre (coming from the northwest) and crossing the Rapides Plats; then a large loop to the north where the river bypass the island of the Notary, to turn southeast, until the confluence of the Pémonca river (coming from South West);

  first by forming a loop towards the south-east by crossing two series of rapids going up towards the north; then forming a big M where the current crosses the Little Bear Falls, then the Big Bear Falls, up to a bend in the river;
  south-east, bypassing Adhémar Island, until the confluence of the Salmon river (coming from the west);
  towards the south-east by crossing the Michel waterfall, passing under the railway bridge, crossing two series of rapids, up to the Carbonneau bridge which connects downtown Saint-Félicien at the north shore;

The river finally flows into Lac Saint-Jean a few kilometers downstream from Saint-Félicien, near Saint-Prime. The river finally flows into Lac Saint-Jean a few kilometers downstream from Saint-Félicien, near Saint-Prime.

Municipal territories crossed by the river

Starting from the upstream (Ashuapmushuan Lake), the course of the Ashuapmushuan river descends, crossing the following municipal territories:

From the confluence of the Du Chef River and the Saint-Félicien limit, the course of the Ashuapmushuan river turns out to be the limit between the Maria-Chapdelaine Regional County Municipality (side north of the river) and Le Domaine-du-Roy Regional County Municipality (south side).

History

The Ashuapmushuan River Basin is home to several archaeological sites that show that indigenous people occupied the area for thousands of years. European explorers and missionaries came in the 17th century. For instance, Charles Albanel used the river for his voyage to Hudson Bay in 1672.

In 1685, French fur traders set up a trading post on the eastern shore of Lake Ashuapmushuan that remained almost continuously in operation until the middle of the 19th century. It successively came under control of the Traite de Tadoussac (French period), King's Posts (English period), the North West Company (1802), and the Hudson's Bay Company (1821). During this period, the river became a major link in the fur trade route from Tadoussac to Hudson Bay since its source is just east of Lake Mistassini on the Rupert River. The vestiges of the post are considered some of the most valuable and best preserved relics from the era.

After the fur trade, the Ashuapmushuan River was used by logging companies to drive logs downstream.

Fauna
The Ashuapmushuan River and its tributaries provide spawning grounds and habitats for landlocked salmon (Salmo salar ouananiche). Newly hatched salmon remain in the river for 2 to 4 years before migrating to Lake Saint-Jean where it remains for most of its adult life. Then, at age 4 to 8, it will return to the river to spawn. While the Ashuapmushuan River has significantly contributed to salmon production for the lake, the salmon population has seen a sharp decline in the 1990s. Despite conservation measures, its status remains of concern.

References

Rivers of Saguenay–Lac-Saint-Jean